Yinmabin District is a newly created district in southern Sagaing Division, Burma (Myanmar); which was formerly part of Monywa District. Its administrative center is the city of Yinmabin.

Administrative divisions

Yinmabin District consists of the following townships:

 Kani Township
 Pale Township
 Salingyi Township
 Yinmabin Township

Notes

Districts of Myanmar
Sagaing Region